Raipur Assembly constituency is an assembly constituency in Bankura district in the Indian state of West Bengal. It is reserved for scheduled tribes.

Overview
As per orders of the Delimitation Commission, No. 250 Raipur Assembly constituency (ST) is composed of the following: Raipur and Sarenga community development blocks.

Raipur  Assembly constituency  is part of No. 36 Bankura (Lok Sabha constituency).

Election results

2021

2016

2011

1977-2006
In the 2006, 2001, 1996, 1991, 1987 and 1982 state assembly elections, Upen Kisku of CPI(M) won the Raipur assembly seat defeating his nearest rivals Bibhabati Tudu of Trinamool Congress, Kshetra Mohan Hansda, Independent, Smritirekha Kisku of Congress, Aditya Kisku, Independent, and Bhabaosh Saren of Congress (two consecutive elections), respectively. Contests in most years were multi cornered but only winners and runners are being mentioned. Apindra Kisku of CPI(M) defeated Gangadhar Murmu of Congress in 1977.

1952-1972
Maniklal Besra of CPI won in 1972. Babulal Saren of Jharkhand Party won in 1971. Bhabatosh Saren of Bangla Congress won in 1969 and 1967. Sudha Rani Dutta of Congress won in 1962. In 1957 and 1952 Raipur had dual/ joint seats. Jadu Nath Murmu and Sudha Rani Dutta, both of Congress, won in 1957. Jadu Nath Murmu, Independent, and Jatindra Nath Basu of Congress, won in independent India's first election in 1952.

References

Assembly constituencies of West Bengal
Politics of Bankura district